Oneida County is a county in the state of New York, United States. As of the 2020 census, the population was 232,125. The county seat is Utica. The name is in honor of the Oneida, one of the Five Nations of the Iroquois League or Haudenosaunee, which had long occupied this territory at the time of European encounter and colonization. The federally recognized Oneida Indian Nation has had a reservation in the region since the late 18th century, after the American Revolutionary War.

Oneida County is part of the Utica–Rome, NY Metropolitan Statistical Area.

History

When England established colonial counties in the Province of New York in 1683, the territory of present Oneida County was included in a very large, mostly undeveloped Albany County. This county included the northern part of present-day New York State as well as all of the present state of Vermont and, in theory, extended westward to the Pacific Ocean. This county was reduced in size on July 3, 1766, to create Cumberland County, and further on March 16, 1770, by the creation of Gloucester County, both containing territory now in Vermont.

On March 12, 1772, what was left of Albany County was split into three parts, one remaining under the name Albany County. Tryon County contained the western portion (and thus, since no western boundary was specified, theoretically still extended west to the Pacific). The eastern boundary of Tryon County was approximately five miles west of the present city of Schenectady in the Mohawk River Valley, and the county included the western part of the Adirondack Mountains and the area west of the West Branch of the Delaware River. Tryon County was later divided to organize 37 distinct counties of New York State. The county was named for William Tryon, colonial governor of New York.

During and after the Revolution, most of the Loyalists in Tryon County fled to Canada. In 1784, following the peace treaty that ended the American Revolutionary War, Americans changed the name of Tryon County to Montgomery County to honor the general, Richard Montgomery, who had captured several places in Canada and died attempting to capture the city of Quebec. They replaced the name of the British governor.

In 1789, Montgomery County was reduced by the splitting off of Ontario County from Montgomery. The area taken from Montgomery County contained all of present-day Allegany, Cattaraugus, Chautauqua, Erie, Genesee, Livingston, Monroe, Niagara, Orleans, Steuben, Wyoming, Yates, and part of Schuyler and Wayne counties, as well as Ontario County.

After continued new settlement, in 1791 Herkimer County was one of three counties taken from Montgomery (the other two being Otsego, and Tioga County). It was much larger than the present Herkimer County, however, and was reduced by a number of subsequent splits.

In 1794, Herkimer County was reduced in size by the creation of Onondaga County. This county was larger than the current Onondaga County, including the present Cayuga, Cortland, and part of Oswego counties.

In 1798, Oneida County was created from another part of Herkimer County. This county was larger than the current Oneida County, as it included the present-day Jefferson (which extends along Lake Ontario), Lewis, and part of Oswego counties.

In 1805, Jefferson and Lewis counties were split off from Oneida. In 1816, parts of Oneida and Onondaga counties were taken to form the new Oswego County.

In 1848, John Humphrey Noyes founded a religious and Utopian community, the Oneida Community, near Oneida.  Its unconventional views on religion and relations between the sexes generated much controversy. The community lasted until 1881. The Oneida Silver Company was founded here to manufacture sterling silver, silverplate holloware and, later, stainless steel flatware.

Geography

Oneida County is in the central portion of New York State, east of Syracuse, and west of Albany. Oneida Lake is on the northwestern corner of the county, and the Adirondack Park is on the northeast. Part of the Tug Hill Plateau is in the northern part of the county. Oneida County's highest point lies neither on the plateau nor in the Adirondack Park, but in the county's southern extremity. The peak's name is Tassel Hill. It is located slightly southeast of Hardscrabble Road (Tassel Hill Road), between the villages of Waterville and Cassville.

The Erie Canal, completed in 1825, runs east–west along the Mohawk River through the county. It stimulated considerable trade and settlement. Oneida Lake and Oneida Creek form part of the western boundary.

In the early 21st century, Oneida is the only county in New York state documented as having Chronic wasting disease among its wild White-tailed deer.

Adjacent counties
 Lewis County – north
 Herkimer County – east
 Otsego County – southeast
 Madison County – southwest
 Oswego County – west

National protected area
 Fort Stanwix National Monument

Demographics

As of the census of 2000, there were 235,469 people, 90,496 households, and 59,184 families residing in the county.  The population density was 194 people per square mile (75/km2).  There were 102,803 housing units at an average density of 85 per square mile (33/km2).  The racial makeup of the county was 90.21% White, 5.74% African American, 0.23% Native American, 1.16% Asian, 0.02% Pacific Islander, 1.11% from other races, and 1.52% from two or more races. Hispanic or Latino of any race were 3.20% of the population.

21.7% were of Italian, 13.1% Irish, 12.1% German, 9.9% Polish, 8.5% English and 5.6% American ancestry according to self-identification of ethnic background in Census 2000. 90.6% spoke English, 2.7% Spanish, 1.3% Italian, 1.2% Serbo-Croatian and 1.1% Polish as their first language.

There were 90,496 households, out of which 30.40% had children under the age of 18 living with them, 49.10% were married couples living together, 12.00% had a female householder with no husband present, and 34.60% were non-families. 29.50% of all households were made up of individuals, and 13.10% had someone living alone who was 65 years of age or older.  The average household size was 2.43 and the average family size was 3.02.

In the county, the population was spread out, with 23.90% under the age of 18, 8.60% from 18 to 24, 28.20% from 25 to 44, 22.90% from 45 to 64, and 16.50% who were 65 years of age or older.  The median age was 38 years. For every 100 females there were 98.60 males.  For every 100 females age 18 and over, there were 96.30 males.

The median income for a household in the county was $35,909, and the median income for a family was $45,341. Males had a median income of $32,194 versus $24,295 for females. The per capita income for the county was $18,516.  About 9.80% of families and 13.00% of the population were below the poverty line, including 18.90% of those under age 18 and 8.50% of those age 65 or over.

2020 Census

Government and politics

|}

Oneida County was governed by a board of supervisors until 1962, when the county charter was changed to create a county executive and a 29-seat county legislature. The county executive is elected by the entire county. On January 1, 2014, the Oneida County Legislature was reduced to 23 seats. All 23 members are elected from single-member districts. Currently, there are 14 Republicans and nine Democrats.

Oneida County also leans Republican in major statewide and national elections. The last Democratic presidential nominee to carry Oneida County was Bill Clinton in 1996, by plurality. The last Democrat to win a majority in the county was Lyndon Johnson in his 1964 landslide. In 2008, Republican John McCain won the county by 6,000 votes out of 90,000 cast. He won all municipalities in the county except the city of Utica and the town of Kirkland. In 2012, Republican Mitt Romney won the county by even fewer votes, by around 4,000 plus votes. Republican Donald Trump returned the county to its reliably red roots, posting strong victories in both 2016 and 2020.

Economy
The main product of Oneida County was once silverware, chiefly manufactured at Oneida Ltd.'s headquarters in Sherrill.  In January 2005, the company ceased manufacturing their product, closing its main plant and selling its assets. The factory, under new ownership, continues to produce American-made silverware under the Liberty Tabletop brand.

Currently the largest non-governmental, non-healthcare product of Oneida County is gambling.  Turning Stone Casino Resort is an enterprise of the Oneida Indian Nation of New York, and the largest private employer in Oneida County.

Education
 Tertiary
 Hamilton College
 Mohawk Valley Community College
 Oneida Institute (defunct)
 State University of New York Polytechnic Institute
 Utica University

 Public school districts
 Adirondack Central School District
 Brookfield Central School District
 Camden Central School District
 Central Square Central School District
 Clinton Central School District
 Holland Patent Central School District
 Madison Central School District
 Mount Markham Central School District
 New Hartford Central School District
 New York Mills Union Free School District
 Oneida City School District
 Oriskany Central School District
 Poland Central School District
 Remsen Central School District
 Rome City School District
 Sauquoit Valley Central School District
 Sherrill City School District
 Stockbridge Valley Central School District
 Utica City School District
 Waterville Central School District
 Town of Webb Union Free School District
 West Canada Valley Central School District
 Westmoreland Central School District
 Whitesboro Central School District

 State-operated schools
 New York State School for the Deaf

Communities

Cities
 Rome
 Sherrill
 Utica (county seat)

Towns

 Annsville
 Augusta
 Ava
 Boonville
 Bridgewater
 Camden
 Deerfield
 Florence
 Floyd
 Forestport
 Kirkland
 Lee
 Marcy
 Marshall
 New Hartford
 Paris
 Remsen
 Sangerfield
 Steuben
 Trenton
 Vernon
 Verona
 Vienna
 Western
 Westmoreland
 Whitestown

Villages

 Boonville
 Camden
 Clayville
 Clinton
 Holland Patent
 New Hartford
 New York Mills
 Oneida Castle
 Oriskany
 Oriskany Falls
 Remsen
 Sylvan Beach
 Vernon
 Waterville
 Whitesboro
 Yorkville

Census-designated places

 Barneveld
 Bridgewater
 Chadwicks
 Clark Mills
 Durhamville
 Hamilton College
 Lake Delta
 Marcy
 North Bay
 Otter Lake
 Prospect
 Stittville
 Verona
 Washington Mills
 Westernville
 Westmoreland
 White Lake

Hamlets

 Blossvale
 Cassville
 Deansboro
 Jewell
 Lee Center
 Lower South Bay
 McConnellsville
 Point Rock
 Sauquoit
 Taberg
 Vernon Center
 Verona Mills

Notable locations
 Fort Stanwix
 Oriskany Battlefield State Historic Site
 Steuben Memorial State Historic Site

See also

 List of counties in New York
 List of New York State Historic Markers in Oneida County, New York
 National Register of Historic Places listings in Oneida County, New York
 Oneida, New York, a city in Madison County
 Oneida Community, a former religious community

References

Further reading

External links

 Oneida County, New York official site
 Oneida County town histories
 

 
Utica–Rome metropolitan area
1798 establishments in New York (state)
Populated places established in 1798
New York placenames of Native American origin